Uyar is a town and the administrative center of Uyarsky District of Krasnoyarsk Krai, Russia, located on the Uyarka River (Yenisei's basin)  east of Krasnoyarsk. Population:

History
It has been known to exist since 1760. In the 19th century, the Trans-Siberian Railway was laid right through the settlement and a small railway station, known as Klyukvennaya, was also built there. It was there that during the Russian Civil War the Polish 5th Rifle Division capitulated to the Bolsheviks in the course of the White Retreat from Siberia. Town status was granted in 1944. The full name of the town, Uyarspasopreobrazhenskoye, is rarely used.

Administrative and municipal status
Within the framework of administrative divisions, Uyar serves as the administrative center of Uyarsky District. As an administrative division, it is incorporated within Uyarsky District as the district town of Uyar. As a municipal division, the district town of Uyar is incorporated within Uyarsky Municipal District as Uyar Urban Settlement.

References

Notes

Sources

Cities and towns in Krasnoyarsk Krai
Yeniseysk Governorate